Rollin or Rollin' may refer to:

Music

Albums
 [[Rollin' (Bay City Rollers album)|Rollin (Bay City Rollers album)]], 1974
 [[Rollin' (Freddie Hubbard album)|Rollin (Freddie Hubbard album)]], 1982
 [[Rollin' (Texas Hippie Coalition album)|Rollin''' (Texas Hippie Coalition album)]] or the title song, 2010
 [[Rollin' (B1A4 EP)|Rollin (B1A4 EP)]] or the title song, 2017
 [[Rollin' (Brave Girls EP)|Rollin (Brave Girls EP)]] or the title song (see below), 2017
 Rollin', by Ava Leigh, 2008 (unreleased)

Songs
 "Rollin (Brave Girls song), 2017
 "Rollin" (Calvin Harris song), 2017
 "Rollin (Limp Bizkit song), 2000
 "Rollin, by Garth Brooks from Fresh Horses, 1995
 "Rollin, by Hootie & the Blowfish from Imperfect Circle, 2019
 "Rollin, by Ish featuring Stef Lang, 2012
 "Rollin, by Kylie Minogue from Golden, 2018
 "Rollin, by Lil Wayne from Sorry 4 the Wait, 2011
 "Rollin, by Little Big Town from The Breaker, 2017
 "Rollin, by Randy Newman from Good Old Boys, 1974
 "Rollin, by Twice from the album Twicetagram, 2017
 "Rollin' (The Ballad of Big & Rich)", by Big & Rich from Horse of a Different Color'', 2004

Other uses
 Rollin (name)
 Rollin Township, Michigan, United States
 Rollin (video game), a 1995 video game for MS-DOS created by Ticsoft
 Rollin Motors, a 1920s American car brand founded by Rollin White; see White Motor Company

See also 
 Rollin film, a film of liquid helium
 Rolling (disambiguation)